All Saints' Church is an Anglican church in Alton, Hampshire, England. It is a Grade II listed building by English Heritage.

Alton, Hampshire
Church of England church buildings in Hampshire
Grade II listed churches in Hampshire